Quaker Meeting may refer to:

 Monthly meeting, the basic unit of administration in the Religious Society of Friends (Quakers)
 Meeting for worship, a Quaker religious practice comparable to a church service
 Quaker meeting (game)
 Quaker Meeting (Quakertown, New Jersey), a historic district

See also
 Friends meeting house